Dos  (English: Two) is the title of the second album by Colombian Pop and Vallenato singer Fanny Lu. The album was released in Colombia on December 8, 2008, and in the United States and Puerto Rico the following week. In Colombia, Dos went straight to number one in the album charts in its debut week. The album features the lead single and the official song of the year in Colombia, "Tú No Eres Para Mi" (You Are Not For Me).

Album information
The album was greeted with huge anticipation following the success of the lead single "Tú No Eres Para Mi". The hit was number one on Colombian radio for eleven weeks. As well as this, there were high expectations considering the success of Fanny's first album, Lágrimas Cálidas (English: "Warm Tears"), which spent nine weeks at number one in Colombia. Fanny Lu produced the album and co-wrote many of the tracks, most notably "Un Minuto Más" (English: "One More Minute"), a duet with Noel Schajris. The song is a tribute to her late father who was murdered. Weeks before the release of the album, Fanny stated that "We were looking for a fusion of sounds. I didn't limit myself. I gave myself the luxury of exploring, because it was important not to repeat what I'd done. For example, many times, instead of accordions, we experimented with winds. This album is like a walk along all those genres I love, and all the songs have their own palate and color."

Track listing

Credits and personnel
Credits adapted from Dos liner notes.

Diego Acosta – audio engineer, mastering engineer
Pablo Bernál – drums
César Bohorquéz – audio engineering, mastering engineer
Richard Bravo – percussion
Andrés Castro – guitar
Mike Couzzi – audio engineer, mastering engineer
Yina Gallego – vocals
Iker Gastaminza – audio production, composer, executive producer, producer
José Gaviria – mix engineer
Lee Levin – drums
Juan Cristóbal Losada – audio engineer, mastering engineer
John Lozano – accordion, vocals

Fanny Lu – vocals
Boris Milan – mix engineer
Teddy Mullet - trombone, trumpet
Andrés Múnera – audio production, composer, guitar, producer, record producer
Javier Olivencia – saxophone
José Luis Perales – composer
Jordan Quamina – audio engineer
Luisito Quintero – percussion
Catalina Rodríguez - vocals
Milton Salcedo - audio production, post-producer, recorder
Noel Schajris - composer
Camilo Valencia – saxophone

Charts

Certifications

References

Fanny Lu albums
2008 albums
Universal Music Latino albums